Churchill Brothers FC Goa, or simply known as Churchill Brothers, is an Indian professional football club based in Margao, Goa, that competes in the I-League, alongside Goa Professional League. Founded in 1988 in Margao, the club usually participated in the National Football League, then top tier of Indian football league system.

The club has won the I-League title twice and has secured a position among the top three teams on nine other occasions in the national league. It has also won eight Goa League Champions Cups, three Durand Cups, and a Federation Cup.

The Red Machine was led for decades by Churchill Alemao, who was also the president of Goa Football Association and the Chief Minister of Goa. His daughter Valanka Alemao is current CEO of the club. Churchill Brothers emerged as fourth ranked Indian team, and 648 universally, in the international rankings of clubs during the first ten years of the 21st century (2001–2010), issued by the International Federation of Football History & Statistics in 2011.

History

1988–2009
Churchill Brothers FC were founded in 1988 as Varca Club. After one season, they  renamed as Brothers Sporting Club. Later on they were bought out by Churchill Braz Alemao and renamed as Churchill Brothers FC and emerged as runners-up of the National Football League thrice: 1996–97, 1999–2000 and 2001–02. In the 1997–98 Asian Club Championship, Churchill Brothers went on to represent India. But, they had a forgetful debut outing as the Goan outfit was knocked out in the very first round by Vietnamese club Dong Thap with 2–1 aggregate loss. In 1998, Churchill roped in Bassim Yonan, the first Iraqi player in India.

After the take over by Churchill, the club went on to win the Durand Cup in 2007 and the 2008–09 I-League, Durand Cup in 2009, IFA Shield in the same year. They also emerged as runners-up of the 2007–08 I-League, the inaugural season. Through their I-League win Churchill Brothers FC were able to play in the 2010 Asian Champions League qualifiers which they lost and moved to the 2010 AFC Cup. During the AFC Cup they won two games against Al-Hilal Al-Sahili and finished runners up in their group, advancing to the next round. Finally, they were defeated 1–2 to Al-Qadsia at the Mohammed Al-Hamad Stadium.

2010–2019
Churchill Brothers had contracted manager Vincent Subramaniam for the 2010–11 season but through the season Vincent left his post as the manager and club went the rest of the season with Croatian Drago Mamić, who has helped them win the IFA Shield that year.

On 9 June 2011, Churchill Brothers announced they have signed former Portugal national football team assistant coach Manuel Gomes as permanent coach. His start proved to be successful as the club captured the 2011 Durand Cup for the third team in their history in October 2011, defeating Prayag United 5–4. However, on 15 February 2012, it was announced that Gomes had resigned and that former coach Carlos Roberto Pereira would be brought in on a caretaker basis.

Then on 13 July 2012, it was announced that Mariano Dias had been signed to become their new full-time head coach. After his first season in charge, Dias managed to lead Churchill Brothers to the I-League championship, their second domestic title in the history.

After the end of 2013–14 I-League season, Churchill finished on twelfth position with 25 points in 24 matches and was evicted from I-League for not fulfilling the Asian Football Confederation's club licensing criteria. In that season, they clinched the 2013–14 Indian Federation Cup title.

In November 2017, it was announced that Ukrainian Mykola Shevchenko joined Churchill as their head coach. His first game as manager occurred on 2 December 2017, when Churchill took on Shillong Lajong, resulting in a 2–0 loss. His stint came to an end as he was sacked from the position. Churchill then roped in Joseph Afusi of Nigeria as technical derector, but were relegated at the end of the 2017–18 season, with just 17 points from 18 games. However, their position was reinstated by the AIFF, after a successful appeal by the club.

In August 2018, Romanian 
Petre Gigiu was appointed as head coach. His first competitive game was on 28 October 2018 in Churchill's opening match against the reigning champions, Minerva Punjab. The match ended in a 0–0 draw. At the end of the 2018–19 I-League season, they finished on fourth position with 34 points.

2020–present
In September 2020, Churchill appointed Fernando Santiago Varela as head coach. Under his guidance, Churchill emerged as the runners-up of the 2020–21 I-League with 29 points. Although Churchill managed a win against RoundGlass Punjab in their last match, Gokulam Kerala FC were crowned champions courtesy of a better head-to-head record.

Ahead of the 2021–22 I-League, Churchill roped in their first ever Guinean player Sekou Sylla, and Romanian Petre Gigiu returned to the club as head coach. They finished the season in fourth place. The club later in November, reached final of Baji Rout Cup in Odisha, finished as runners-up after defeat to Rajasthan United.

Crest and colours

Crest
In 2011, a new red and black crest was introduced. The crest of Churchill Brothers was originally green and yellow. The first crest had a football on green grass with yellow rays representing the sun rays.

Colours

The present colours of Churchill Brothers kit is red for home matches and blue for away matches, but before the brand new crest the home colours were white and the away colours were red.

Kit manufacturers and shirt sponsors

Stadiums

Since the I-League began, Churchill Brothers have always played mainly at the Fatorda Stadium in the South Goan city of Margao along with other Goan clubs Dempo, Salgaocar, Sporting Goa and Vasco. They also sometimes use the Tilak Maidan Stadium for both I-League and Goa Professional League matches.

During the 2012–13 season Churchill Brothers temporarily played at the Duler Stadium in Mapusa, Goa, while the Fatorda Stadium was being renovated for the 2013 Lusophony Games and the Tilak Maidan was being renovated up to AFC standards.

During the 2013 AFC Cup, Churchill Brothers used Shri Shiv Chhatrapati Sports Complex in Pune as their home ground. The club later in 2022–23 season, moved to GMC Athletic Stadium in Bambolim.

Rivalries
Churchill Brothers has a major rivalry with their fellow Goan side Dempo, popularly known as the "Goan Derby".

They have also rivalries with other two Goan sides, Sporting Clube de Goa and Salgaocar, whom they faced in I-League, and currently in Goa Professional League.

Players

First-team squad

Personnel

Current technical staff

Honours

League
I-League
Champions (2): 2008–09, 2012–13
Runners-up (3): 2007–08, 2009–10, 2020–21
National Football League
Runners-up (3): 1996–97, 1999–2000, 2001–02
Third place (2): 1997–98, 1999–00
National Football League II
Runners-up (1): 2005–06

Cup

Durand Cup
Champions (3): 2007, 2009, 2011
Runners-up (2): 2001–02, 2008
Federation Cup
Champions (1): 2013–14
IFA Shield
Champions (2): 2009, 2011
Rovers Cup
Runners-up (3): 1997, 1999, 2000–01
Goa Governor's Cup
Champions (3): 2000, 2002, 2003
Runners-up (2): 1999, 2001
Goa Police Cup
Champions (1): 1999
Runners-up (1): 2018
Baji Rout Cup
Runners-up (1): 2022

Regional
Goa Professional League
Champions (8): 1995–96, 1996–97, 1997–98, 1999, 2000, 2001, 2008–09, 2019–20

Performance in AFC competitions

 Asian Club Championship: 1 appearance
1997–98: 1st round
 AFC Champions League: 2 appearances
2002–03: Qualifying round 3
2010: Qualifying play-off	

AFC Cup: 3 appearances
2010: Round of 16
2013: Group stage
2014: Round of 16

Records

Key
Tms. = Number of teams
Pos. = Position in league
Attendance/G = Average league attendance

Seasons

Managerial history

 Armando Colaco (1994–1999)
 Danny McLennan (1999–2000)
 Gregory Testvin (2000–2001)
 T. K. Chathunni (2001–2002)
 Marcus Pacheco (2002–2004)
 Shabbir Ali (2004–2005)
 György Kottán (2005–2006)
 Karim Bencherifa (2006–2008)
 Emeka Ezeugo (2008)
 Zoran Đorđević (2008–2009)
 Carlos Roberto Pereira (2009–2010)
 Vincent Subramaniam (2010–2011)
 Drago Mamić (2011)
 Sukhwinder Singh (2011)
 Manuel Gomes (2011–2012)
 Carlos Roberto Pereira (2012)
 Mariano Dias (2012–2014)
 Joseph Afusi (2014)
 Alfred Fernandes (2014–2016)
 Joseph Afusi (2016–2017)
 Derrick Pereira (2017)
 Mykola Shevchenko (2017)
 Petre Gigiu (2018–2019)
 Edward Ansah (2019)
 Bernardo Tavares (2019–2020)
 Mateus Costa (2020)
 Fernando Santiago Varela (2020–2021)
 Petre Gigiu (2021–2022)
  Antonio Rueda Fernández (2022)
  Fernando Santiago Varela (2022–2023)

Notable players
For all current and former notable Churchill Brothers players with a Wikipedia article, see: Churchill Brothers FC Goa players.

World Cup players
  Emeka Ezeugo (1997–1998)
  Anthony Wolfe (2014, 2017, 2018–2019)

Other departments

Women's team
The club has a women's section, that competes in Goa Women's League, and won the league title in 2022–23 season.

Honours
Goa Women's League
Champions (1): 2022–23

Youth team
Churchill Brothers' U17 youth men's team competes in the Hero Youth League.

See also
 List of Churchill Brothers S.C. seasons
 List of Goan State Football Champions
 Indian football clubs in Asian competitions

Notes

References

Further reading

External links
 
 
 Team profile at the-aiff.com (AIFF)
 Team archive at WorldFootball.net
Team profile at Global Sports Archive

 
Association football clubs established in 1988
Football clubs in Goa
1988 establishments in Goa

I-League clubs